"Rute" may refer to:
Rute, a municipality of Córdoba, Spain
Rute, Gotland, a settlement on the Swedish island of Gotland
Rüte, a municipality of Appenzell Innerrhoden, Switzerland
Rute (music), a type of drum beater
Rute Plateau, a plateau in Lower Carniola, Slovenia
Juan Rute (fl. 16th century), English sailor and explorer
Rute Gunnay, a Star Wars character

See also
Rutte (disambiguation)
Rutebeuf, a French trouvère